Hemiocnus insolens is a species of sea cucumber from the family Cucumariidae. It is found along the coast of south-western Africa, ranging east to Port Elizabeth.

References

Cucumariidae
Animals described in 1886